Anthophagus is a genus of beetles belonging to the family Staphylinidae.

The genus was first described by Gravenhorst in 1802.

Species:
 Anthophagus angusticollis
 Anthophagus caraboides
 Anthophagus omalinus

References

Staphylinidae
Staphylinidae genera